Villini is a tribe of bee flies in the family Bombyliidae.

Genera

Astrophanes Osten Sacken, 1886
Caecanthrax Greathead, 1981
Chrysanthrax Osten Sacken, 1886
Cyananthrax Painter, 1959
Deusopora Hull, 1971
Diochanthrax Hall, 1975
Dipalta Osten Sacken, 1877
Diplocampta Schiner, 1868
Exechohypopion Evenhuis, 1991
Exhyalanthrax Becker, 1916
Hemipenthes Loew, 1869
Ins Evenhuis, 2020
Laminanthrax Greathead, 1967
Lepidanthrax Osten Sacken, 1886
Mancia Coquillett, 1886
Marleyimyia Hesse, 1956
Neodiplocampta Curran, 1934
Oestranthrax Bezzi, 1921
Oestrimyza Hull, 1973
Pachyanthrax François, 1964
Paradiplocampta Hall, 1975
Paranthrax Bigot 1876
Paravilla Painter, 1933
Poecilanthrax Osten Sacken, 1886
Rhynchanthrax Painter, 1933
Stonyx Osten Sacken, 1886
Synthesia Bezzi, 1921
Thyridanthrax Osten Sacken, 1886
Veribubo Evenhuis, 1978
Villa Lioy, 1864
Villoestrus Paramonov, 1931

References

External links

 
 
 

Bombyliidae